Kinah, ḳinah or qinah (plural kinoth, qinot, qinoth) is Hebrew for a dirge or lamentation. Its general meaning is a dirge or lament, especially as sung by Jewish professional mourning women. Specifically, it can refer to one of the many Hebrew elegies chanted traditionally on Tisha B'Av. The Jerusalem Bible refers to Isaiah 47 as a qinah or "lament for Babylon", and to Ezekiel 19 as a qinah or lamentation over the rulers  of Israel. A. W. Streane suggests that , on the prophesied downfall of Jerusalem, is written "in Ḳinah metre".

Kinah was also a city in the extreme south of Judah. It was probably not far from the Dead Sea, in the Wady Fikreh.

References 

Hebrew Bible cities
Hebrew words and phrases